The Crime of Helen Stanley is a 1934 American pre-Code crime film directed by D. Ross Lederman and starring Ralph Bellamy, Shirley Grey and Gail Patrick. The film is also known as Murder in the Studio. It was the third in a series of four films featuring Bellamy as Inspector Trent of the NYPD following on from Before Midnight and One Is Guilty. The final film Girl in Danger in the sequence was released later in the year.

Plot
Inspector Trent (Bellamy) investigates the death of film star Helen Stanley (Patrick) on the set. Another actor in the film, Wallach (Stephen Chase, uncredited) believes he has killed Stanley after he put a live bullet into a prop gun when he "shot" her, and commits suicide after confessing. However the live bullet was still in Wallach's gun. 

Other suspects are the cameraman, Stanley's lover Lee Davis (Richmond), her sister, Betty Lane (Grey), who is having an affair with Davis. Also in the mix are  Stanley's business manager, George Noel (Page) who owed her $60,000, the director Gibson (Prival) who Stanley knew was an illegal alien, and Stanley's bodyguard, Karl Williams (Sherman), who was blackmailing her. Trent solves the mystery by reenacting the murder, where the true killer is revealed.

Cast
 Ralph Bellamy as Inspector Steve Trent
 Shirley Grey as Betty Lane
 Gail Patrick as Helen Stanley
 Kane Richmond as Lee Davis
 Bradley Page as George T. Noel
 Vincent Sherman as Karl Williams
 Phillip Trent as Larry King (as Clifford Jones)
 Lucien Prival as Gibson
 Ward Bond as Jack Baker

References

Bibliography
 Backer, Ron. Mystery Movie Series of 1930s Hollywood. McFarland, 2012.

External links
 

1934 films
1934 crime films
American crime films
1930s English-language films
American black-and-white films
Films directed by D. Ross Lederman
Columbia Pictures films
1930s American films